Safonovo is a rural locality (a village) in Borisoglebskoye Rural Settlement, Muromsky District, Vladimir Oblast, Russia. The population was 16 as of 2010.

Geography 
Safonovo is located 57 km northeast of Murom (the district's administrative centre) by road. Zakharovo is the nearest rural locality.

References 

Rural localities in Muromsky District